Andy's Jazz Club, located several blocks north of the Chicago Loop, was founded as "Andy's 11 E. Lounge" in 1951 by Andy Rizzuto. A group of investors bought the property in 1975, changing its name to "Andy's". The club is one of the city's most popular jazz venues.

In 1977 jazz promoters Penny Tyler and John Defauw began producing midday jazz sessions at Andy's, which was later expanded to include performances later in the day with sets at 5pm and 9pm. The 5pm performance - known as "Jazz at Five" - has since become a Chicago tradition.

Performers at the club have included Larry Coryell, Franz Jackson,  Von Freeman, and Joey DeFrancesco.

External links
Official Website
Club History

References

Jazz clubs in Chicago
1951 establishments in Illinois
Music venues completed in 1951